This is a list of universities in Eritrea.

Colleges

References

Universities
Eritrea, list of universities in
Eritrea

Universities